Carl Olof Tallgren (born 28 January 1927) is a Finnish politician who served as the minister of finance between 1970 and 1971. He is one of the former heads of the Swedish People's Party of Finland.

Early life and education
Tallgren was born in Turku on 28 January 1927, and his parents are office manager and deputy consul Karl Nikolai Tallgren and Ella Alica Lindh. He graduated from the Swedish Classical High School in 1945. Then he attended the Turku Academy and in 1951 graduated with a bachelor's degree in politics. He also received a PhD.

Career
Following  graduation Tallgren was employed as an ombudsman at the Åboland Municipal Association in 1952 and worked there for ten years until 1962. In 1957 he also became an operations manager in Åboland district for the Finnish Red Cross.  Next year he was appointed deputy to Foreign Affairs Minister Ralf Törngren. In 1961 Tallgren was elected to the Finnish Parliament for the Swedish People's Party of Finland representing Åboland when Törngren died and served at the Parliament until 1975. 

Tallgren was appointed the minister of finance in Ahti Karjalainen's second cabinet on 15 July 1970, and his term lasted until 29 October 1971. He succeeded Kristian Gestrin in 1974 as chairman of the Swedish People's Party of Finland which he held until 1977 when Pär Stenbäck took over the post.  

He was also employed as a treasurer at the Turku Academy Foundation in between 1964 and 1973. Following his retirement from politics he was named as managing director of the Art Society Association, and his term lasted until 1991. He served in the boards of different companies and foundations, including the Foundation for Åbo Akademi University (1982–1997), Oy Partek Ab, Konstsamfundet, Oy Stockmann Ab, Oy City Forum Ab, and Hufvudstadsbladet Ab m.fl.

Personal life
Tallgren married the economist Gurli Vivica Öhman in 1950.

References

External links

20th-century Finnish businesspeople
21st-century Finnish businesspeople
1927 births
Finnish political scientists
Living people
Members of the Parliament of Finland (1962–66)
Members of the Parliament of Finland (1966–70)
Members of the Parliament of Finland (1970–72)
Members of the Parliament of Finland (1972–75)
Ministers of Finance of Finland
People from Turku
Swedish People's Party of Finland politicians
Swedish-speaking Finns
University of Helsinki alumni